Shahid Khan (born 1952) is a Pakistani-American businessman and sports tycoon. 

Shahid Khan may also refer to:

 Shahid Khan (actor), Pakistani film actor noted in Pashto cinema 
 Shahid Khan (born 1981), British-Pakistani musician known as Naughty Boy
 Mahewish Shahid Khan (born 1981), female Pakistani cricketer
 Shahid Ali Khan (field hockey) (born 1964), Pakistani hockey player
 Shahid Ali Khan (Qawwal singer), Canadian singer
 Shahid Ashfaqallah Khan (1900–1927), Indian freedom fighter
 Shahid Masood Khan, Pakistani doctor and journalist
 Shahid Parvez Khan (born 1955), sitar player
 Shahid Zaman Khan (born 1982), Pakistani squash player